Vladimir Petrovich Filatov (15 [O.S. 27] February 1875 in Mikhaylovka, Penza Governorate, Russian Empire – 30 October 1956 in Odessa, Ukrainian SSR) was a Russian Empire and Soviet ophthalmologist and surgeon best known for his development of tissue therapy. He introduced the tube flap grafting method, corneal transplantation and preservation of grafts from cadaver eyes. He founded the Institute of Eye Diseases & Tissue Therapy in Odessa, Soviet Union (today Ukraine). Filatov is also credited for restoring Vasily Zaytsev's sight when he suffered an injury to his eyes from a mortar attack during Battle of Stalingrad.
First corneal transplantation was attempted by Filatov on 28 February 1912, but the graft grew opaque. After numerous attempts over the course of many years, Filatov achieved a successful transplantation of cornea from a diseased person on 6 May 1931.

Throughout his life, Filatov made no secret of the fact that he was a faithful Orthodox Christian. The Communist Party honoured him for his medical work, but pretended not to notice his faith.
A large group of official representatives from the Kremlin came for his funeral, which was to be a majestic affair, ending with the bier being burned. His widow asked that his will be read out in front of everyone. He asked for an Orthodox funeral conducted by a bishop, and he wanted to be buried, with the tomb stone proclaiming "I look for the resurrection of the dead." The Kremlin gave permission for his wishes to be fulfilled.

After Filatov's death in 1956, his apprentice Nadezhda Puchkovskaya led the Institute of Eye Diseases & Tissue Therapy in Odessa, which was renamed in honour of Filatov as The Filatov Institute of Eye Diseases & Tissue Therapy.

See also
 Ramón Castroviejo – a Spanish contemporary of Filatov that was also a pioneer in corneal transplantation.
 David Bushmich – an ophthalmologist under Filatov, worked closely with Dr. Puchkovskaya.
 Ashalchi Oki - an ophthalmologist trained by Filatov.

References

External links
 
 Photos of the institute.
 Photo of Filotav's grave.

1875 births
1956 deaths
People from Lyambirsky District
People from Saransky Uyezd
First convocation members of the Verkhovna Rada of the Ukrainian Soviet Socialist Republic
Second convocation members of the Verkhovna Rada of the Ukrainian Soviet Socialist Republic
Third convocation members of the Verkhovna Rada of the Ukrainian Soviet Socialist Republic
Fourth convocation members of the Verkhovna Rada of the Ukrainian Soviet Socialist Republic
Inventors from the Russian Empire
Scientists from the Russian Empire
Surgeons from the Russian Empire
Soviet ophthalmologists
Academicians of the USSR Academy of Medical Sciences
Members of the National Academy of Sciences of Ukraine
Heroes of Socialist Labour
Stalin Prize winners
Recipients of the Order of Lenin
Imperial Moscow University alumni
Soviet inventors